Margareta (c. 1369 – c. 1414)  was a Swedish Sami missionary. She was given permission by the Swedish crown to preach and convert her fellow Sami to Christianity. Her position was unique for her as both a Sami and a woman.

Biography
Margareta was an enthusiastic Christian who worked for the Christianisation of the Sami. It is not known how Margareta herself became a Christian. The name Margareta is not a Sami name and was likely given to her after she became a Christian.  

After having sought the assistance among the Swedish clergy, monk Philippus Petri in Stockholm gave her a letter of recommendation to Vadstena Abbey in April 1389. Petri praised her for her missionary work, described her difficulties and called her a tool of God in the same way as Saint Bridget, and recommended that the Bishop of Uppsala should assist her. 

On 19 July 1389, Bishop Tord Gunnarsson of Strängnäs instructed the monks at Vadstena Abbey to recommend Queen Margaret I of Sweden to order the Bishops of Uppsala and Åbo to send missionaries to the Sami upon her next expected visit to Vadstena. This instruction was sent upon the request of Margareta. He added his admiration for Margareta whom he described as simple, uneducated and unselfish. After having visited Vadstena and been told that the monarch was not due to visit for a long time, she continued to Scania. 

On 6 August, Queen Margaret and Bishop of Lund Magnus Nielsen (Mogens  Nielsen)  issued an instruction to send missionaries to the Sami, and that the Bishop of Uppsala should organized the matter. Margareta thereafter continued her missionary work among the Sami. Her work as a missionary was last mentioned on 17 March 1414.

References

Other sources 
 Ericsson, Ture, "Ur lappmissionens historia", ingår i Kristendomens väg till Sverige : läsebok i kyrkohistoria  (Uppsala 1956)  
Lundgren, Gustaf B, Lappkvinnan Margareta, ingår i J. Nordlander, Norrlands äldsta sägner (Uppsala 1907)
Månsson, Thure, artikel i Svenska Män och Kvinnor 5 (Sthlm 1949)
Söderholm, Wolmar, Lappquinnan Margareta  (Lycksele 1982)
 Svenskt biografiskt lexikon (art av Jan Liedgren), hämtad 2013-10-23.

Further reading 
 

Swedish Sámi people
1369 births
1425 deaths
14th-century Swedish people
15th-century Swedish people
Swedish Christian missionaries
People in Sámi history
Christian missionaries in Sweden
Female Christian missionaries
14th-century Swedish women
15th-century Swedish women